The Oki Pro-Am was a men's professional golf tournament. It was a European Tour event that was only played in 1996 and 1997. It was played at Golf La Moraleja on the number 1 and 2 courses in Madrid, Spain.

Winners

External links
Coverage on the European Tour's official site

Former European Tour events
Golf tournaments in Spain